The red-mouthed goby (Gobius cruentatus) is a species of goby native to the Eastern Atlantic Ocean from southwestern Ireland to the coasts of Morocco and Senegal, and also in the Mediterranean Sea where it occurs in inshore waters at depths of from  in areas with rocky or sandy substrates or in meadows of sea-grass.  This species can reach a length of  TL.  It may also be found in the aquarium trade.

References

External links
 

red-mouthed goby
Fish of the East Atlantic
Fish of the Mediterranean Sea
Marine fauna of North Africa
red-mouthed goby
red-mouthed goby